Stonington Municipal Airport  is a public airport located one mile (1.6 km) northwest of the central business district (CBD) of Stonington, a town in Hancock County, Maine, USA. The airport covers 12 acres and has one runway. It provides service to private and charter aircraft traffic only. Stonington is located on an island named Deer Isle which is only reachable by automobile via a long, narrow suspension bridge.

References 
Airport Master Record (FAA Form 5010), also available as a printable form (PDF)

Airports in Maine
Transportation buildings and structures in Hancock County, Maine